WVFS Tallahassee, launched in 1987, is one of four radio stations that broadcast from the Florida State University in the Tallahassee area. (WFSU, WFSQ and WFSW are the others.)  WVFS is often referred to as V89, "The Voice", or "The Voice of Florida State". WVFS broadcasts at 89.7 FM. The station is staffed by student and community volunteers.  Featuring no automation, the DJ booth at WVFS is staffed 24 hours a day, 7 days a week, every day of the year. New and different music is played to provide an alternative to commercial radio.

Programming 
The programming schedule at WVFS is divided into regular programming and specialty programming. Regular programming time slots include a combination of newly released material, music from the WVFS Catalog, and listener requests.  Regular programming also occasionally features News, Weather, and Concert Updates, promotional announcements, and public service announcements (PSAs). Specialty programming on WVFS consists of 28 named shows of varying lengths which air at routinely scheduled times, either once every week or once every month.

Volunteers 
WVFS holds a volunteer "cattle call" at the beginning of the fall, spring, and summer semesters to recruit volunteers. WVFS accepts student volunteers from Florida State University as well as community volunteers.

Awards

References

External links 
 
WVFS internet community for listeners and volunteers

VFS
Florida State University
VFS
Radio stations established in 1987
1987 establishments in Florida